Quakertown may refer to:

Quakertown, Delaware
Quakertown, Indiana
Quakertown, New Jersey
Quakertown, Pennsylvania
Quakertown, Denton, Texas